Lana Spreeman (August 9, 1955 – November 29, 2016) was a Canadian athlete, who competed in alpine skiing at five Winter Paralympic Games. In her career, she won 13 medals for Canada, making her Canada's most decorated Winter Paralympian until passed by cross country skier Brian McKeever, who earned his 14th medal at the 2018 Winter Paralympics.

She won the first ever gold medal for Giant slalom 2A at the 1980 Winter Paralympics. At the 1994 Winter Paralympics in Lillehammer, she was the Canadian flag bearer at the closing ceremonies.

Spreeman died of brain cancer at the age of 61.

References

External links
 Canadian Paralympic Committee profile
 Martin Cleary, "Disabled skiing a revelation", Ottawa Citizen, February 7, 1980. Mentions Spreeman.

1955 births
2016 deaths
Alpine skiers at the 1980 Winter Paralympics
Alpine skiers at the 1984 Winter Paralympics
Alpine skiers at the 1988 Winter Paralympics
Alpine skiers at the 1992 Winter Paralympics
Alpine skiers at the 1994 Winter Paralympics
Paralympic alpine skiers of Canada
Paralympic bronze medalists for Canada
Paralympic gold medalists for Canada
Paralympic silver medalists for Canada
People from Olds, Alberta
Medalists at the 1980 Winter Paralympics
Medalists at the 1984 Winter Paralympics
Medalists at the 1988 Winter Paralympics
Medalists at the 1992 Winter Paralympics
Medalists at the 1994 Winter Paralympics
Deaths from cancer in Alberta
Neurological disease deaths in Alberta
Deaths from brain tumor
Canadian female alpine skiers
Paralympic medalists in alpine skiing